George Randolph Fearon (March 12, 1883 in Oneida, Madison County, New York – January 2, 1976 in Naples, Collier County, Florida) was an American lawyer and politician from New York. He was President pro tempore of the New York State Senate from 1931 to 1932.

Life
He was the son of George Fearon (1816–1898) and Anna Elizabeth (Charlow) Fearon (1855–1911). He graduated from Oneida High School in 1901, then studied law at Syracuse University and was admitted to the bar in 1905. On November 17, 1909, he married Cora Lucy Nichols (1885–1938), and they had two daughters: Elizabeth Mary Fearon (b. 1915) and Helen Charlow Fearon (b. 1916).

He was a member of the New York State Assembly (Onondaga Co., 3rd D.) in 1916, 1917, 1918, 1919, 1920.

He was a member of the New York State Senate (38th D.) from 1921 to 1936, sitting in the 144th, 145th, 146th, 147th, 148th, 149th, 150th, 151st, 152nd, 153rd, 154th, 155th, 156th, 157th, 158th and 159th New York State Legislatures; and was Temporary President from 1931 to 1932, and Minority Leader from 1933 to 1936. He was a delegate to the 1932 Republican National Convention.

His first wife Cora died in January 1938 during a stomach operation. On March 4, 1939, he married in Bronxville, New York, Bertha (Stone) Moore who had been a delegate to the New York State Constitutional Convention of 1938, and was the widow of Assemblyman Thomas Channing Moore (1872–1931).

On August 5, 1953, he married Katherine McBride.

Sources
 Political Graveyard
 His first wife's obit in NYT on January 13, 1938 (subscription required)
 His engagement, in NYT on August 28, 1938 (subscription required)
 His second marriage, in NYT on March 5, 1939 (subscription required)
 His third marriage, in NYT on August 8, 1953 (subscription required)
 Obit in NYT on January 4, 1976 (giving wrong middle initial "E.") (subscription required)
Eminent Judges and Lawyers of the American Bar by Charles William Taylor
 Obit of his mother, at RootsWeb
 His entry at RootsWeb (mixing up the last name of his second wife and the first name of his third wife)

External links
Costello, Cooney & Fearon PLLC His law firm

1883 births
1976 deaths
People from Oneida, New York
Lawyers from Syracuse, New York
Majority leaders of the New York State Senate
Republican Party New York (state) state senators
Republican Party members of the New York State Assembly
Syracuse University alumni
20th-century American politicians
Politicians from Syracuse, New York
20th-century American lawyers